Notomulciber strandi is a species of beetle in the family Cerambycidae. It was described by Stephan von Breuning in 1939. It is known from Sri Lanka.

It's 11 mm long and 3¼ mm wide, and its type locality is Bogawantalawa, Sri Lanka.  It was named in honor of Embrik Strand, in whose Festschrift the species description was written.

References

Homonoeini
Beetles described in 1939
Taxa named by Stephan von Breuning (entomologist)